Lohs or LOHS may refer to:
 Wolf pack Lohs, a flotilla of German submarines in the Second World War
 Lake Odessa Area Historical Society, Lake Odessa, Michigan, United States

People 
 Gabriele Lohs (born 1957), German rower
 Johannes Lohs (1889–1918), German U-boat commander during the First World War

Schools 
 Lake Orion High School, Lake Orion, Michigan, United States
 Lake Oswego High School, Lake Oswego, Oregon, United States
 Live Oak High School (Louisiana), Watson, Louisiana, United States
 Live Oak High School (Morgan Hill, California), United States
 Lone Oak High School (Kentucky), Lone Oak, Kentucky, United States
 Los Osos High School, Rancho Cucamonga, California, United States

See also 
 Loh (disambiguation)